Henry Littlefield Clement Jr. (born June 15, 1939) is a former American football tight end who played one season for the Pittsburgh Steelers of the NFL. Clement played college football at the University of North Carolina for the North Carolina Tar Heels football team.

References

1939 births
Living people
Pittsburgh Steelers players
American football tight ends
Players of American football from New York City
North Carolina Tar Heels football players